The Prairie King is a 1927 American silent Western film directed by B. Reeves Eason and starring Hoot Gibson. It was produced and distributed by Universal Pictures.

Cast
 Hoot Gibson as Andy Barden
 Barbara Worth as Edna Jordan
 Charles Sellon as Pop Wingate
 Rosa Gore as Aunt Hattie
 Albert Prisco as Dan Murdock
 Robert Homans as Jim Gardner
 George Periolat as Ramon Fernandez

Preservation
 Copies are held at the Library of Congress, Packard Campus for Audio-Visual Conservation and Filmoteca De Catalunya, Barcelona.

References

External links
 The Prairie King at IMDb.com
 
 lobby poster

1927 films
Films directed by B. Reeves Eason
Universal Pictures films
1927 Western (genre) films
American black-and-white films
Silent American Western (genre) films
1920s American films
1920s English-language films